Gender representation in sports politics takes a look at issues bordering how men and women engage in the same sporting event without short-changing any of the sexes. The major consideration in on women and their low turnouts in most sporting events. This write-up tends to address the issue.

Representation in Sports Leadership 

Despite an increase in the number of women involved in sports in recent times, there remains low representation of women in sports executive bodies and inadequate policies meant to increase equal participation. 

The Equal Pay Act of 1963 passed by the United States Congress was an effort to bridge the gender pay gap, though the use the 'same establishment' clause failed to separate different ownership of male and female teams. This made its effort to balance pay ineffective.

The 2010 World Cup in South Africa was a major sporting event that was mainly organized and managed by men. The women involved in organizing the 2010 World Cup were not recognized by the media and predominately participated as assistants and receptionists. The United Nations found that gender discrimination is still inherent in sports, as only 23 percent of women were represented in leadership positions in 2007.

Some success of the efforts to bridge gender inequality in representation can be traced to Norway and Germany which produced the first female representative in international football organisations. Norway had an equal status council which put a committee in place to encourage more women to take part in the management structure of sports organisations. The committee had a goal of equal men and women participation in sports organisations in the nearest future. The election of Nsekera Lydia from Burundi into the executive committee of FIFA is a major success in respect to equal Gender participation in sports leadership.

The International Olympic Committee also recognizes the importance of establishing gender equality in sports, both through athletic participation and leadership roles, and created the International Olympic Committee Gender Equality Review Project in March 2018. The project includes 25 solution-based approaches and resulted from the Olympic Agenda 2020’s goal to improve gender equality in sports.

Sexism in Sports 
Women face various inequalities in the realm of sports and deal with the consequences of being seen as inferior to men. The inequalities placed on female athletes and coaches are the most known, but those same inequalities are put on all women who work in the sports industry such as managers.Some of the inequalities placed on women in the sports industry include sexual harassment or discrimination. The sports culture cultivates sexism, which allows men committing acts of sexual harassment or discrimination towards women in the sports industry to be dismissed.

Lack of Presence on National Boards 
Women in sports are not represented on national boards as much as men. In a study conducted by Johanna Adriaanse it showed women are underrepresented in areas such as board directors (19.7%), board chairs (10.8%) and chief executives (16.3%). The lack of female presence on national sports boards results in a lack of care for female athletes and their decisions.

Title IX 
Title IX is in place to create equality for females in educational programs and sports falls into that bracket. Female athletes are supposed to be protected by Title IX, but compliance with Title IX is not always completed. There is a new proposition to Title IX that would give the power back to the accuser in sexual assault cases because they will be allowed to choose which form of resolution they want. This rule change effects female athletes as well because some of them face sexual harassment or assault at the hands of their peers, coaches, etc. Title IX struggles to represent all races pertaining to female athletes. Most lawsuits that have challenged Title IX pertain to cases with white female athletes and exclude black female athletes (Pickett 78).

References 

Gender and sport
Women in sports
Gender studies
Gender and entertainment
Gender studies articles needing expert attention